The State University System of Florida Libraries is the academic library system of the State University System of Florida (SUS). The library system, which serves Florida's twelve public universities, is one of the largest in the world, with more than 18 million items. Though each campus library is separate, they share a reciprocal borrowing agreement known as the Florida Distance Learning Initiative, signed on February 9, 1999.

The physical collections are scattered across each of the SUS campuses. Their collections and stand-alone library buildings are listed below. Due to organizational differences, having more libraries does not directly translate into a higher volume of specific collections of materials.

List of collections by campus

Florida A&M University

Florida Atlantic University

Florida Gulf Coast University

Florida International University

Florida State University

New College of Florida

University of Central Florida

University of Florida

University of North Florida

University of South Florida

University of West Florida

See also

Education in Florida
Florida College System
Florida Board of Regents
Florida Board of Control
Florida Board of Governors
Florida Student Association
Florida Department of Education
Bright Futures Scholarship Program
State University System of Florida
Advisory Council of Faculty Senates
List of colleges and universities in Florida

References

External links
Combined State University System—SUS Catalog
Florida Board of Governors
Florida Center for Library Automation

.L
Libraries in Florida
Archives in the United States
University and college academic libraries in the United States
1905 establishments in Florida